Fermat's factorization method, named after Pierre de Fermat, is based on the representation of an odd integer as the difference of two squares:

Each odd number has such a representation. Indeed, if  is a factorization of N, then

Since N is odd, then c and d are also odd, so those halves are integers. (A multiple of four is also a difference of squares: let c and d be even.)

In its simplest form, Fermat's method might be even slower than trial division (worst case). Nonetheless, the combination of trial division and Fermat's is more effective than either.

Basic method
One tries various values of a, hoping that , a square.

 FermatFactor(N): // N should be odd
     a ← 
     b2 ← a*a - N
     repeat until b2 is a square:
         a ← a + 1
         b2 ← a*a - N 
      // equivalently: 
      // b2 ← b2 + 2*a + 1 
      // a ← a + 1
Then, . Since 125 is not a square, a second try is made by increasing the value of a by 1. The second attempt also fails, because 282 is again not a square.

The third try produces the perfect square of 441.

Suppose N has more than two prime factors. That procedure first finds the factorization with the least values of a and b. That is,  is the smallest factor ≥ the square-root of N, and so  is the largest factor ≤ root-N. If the procedure finds , that shows that N is prime.

For , let c be the largest subroot factor.

If N is prime (so that ), one needs  steps. This is a bad way to prove primality. But if N has a factor close to its square root, the method works quickly.

Fermat's and trial division
Consider trying to factor the prime number , but also compute b and  throughout.

In practice, one wouldn't bother with that last row until b is an integer. But observe that if N had a subroot factor above , Fermat's method would have found it already.

Trial division would normally try up to 48,432; but after only four Fermat steps, we need only divide up to 47830, to find a factor or prove primality.

This all suggests a combined factoring method. In the above example, with  the bound for trial division is 47830. A reasonable choice could be  giving a bound of 28937.

In this regard, Fermat's method gives diminishing returns. One would surely stop before this point:

Sieve improvement

Squares are always congruent to 0, 1, 4, 5, 9, 16 modulo 20. In this example, N is 17 mod 20, so subtracting 17 mod 20 (or adding 3),  produces 3, 4, 7, 8, 12, and 19 modulo 20 for these values. It is apparent that only the 4 from this list can be a square.

This can be performed with any modulus. Using the same ,

One generally chooses a power of a different prime for each modulus.

Given a sequence of a-values (start, end, and step) and a modulus, one can proceed thus:

 , astart, aend, astep, modulus)
     a ← astart
     do modulus times:
         b2 ← a*a - N
         if b2 is a square, modulo modulus:
             , a, aend, astep * modulus, NextModulus)
         endif
         a ← a + astep
     enddo

But the recursion is stopped when few a-values remain; that is, when/ is small. Also, because a's step-size is constant, one can compute successive b2's with additions.

Multiplier improvement

Fermat's method works best when there is a factor near the square-root of N.

If the approximate ratio of two factors is known, then a rational number  can be picked near that value. , and Fermat's method, applied to Nuv, will find the factors  and  quickly. (Unless c divides u or d divides v.)

Generally, if the ratio is not known, various  values can be tried, and try to factor each resulting Nuv. R. Lehman devised a systematic way to do this, so that Fermat's plus trial division can factor N in  time.

Other improvements
The fundamental ideas of Fermat's factorization method are the basis of the quadratic sieve and general number field sieve, the best-known algorithms for factoring large semiprimes, which are the "worst-case". The end result is the same: a difference of square mod n that, if nontrivial, can be used to factor n''.

See also
Completing the square
Factorization of polynomials
Factor theorem
FOIL rule
Monoid factorisation
Pascal's triangle
Prime factor
Factorization
Euler's factorization method
Integer factorization
Program synthesis
Table of Gaussian integer factorizations
Unique factorization

Notes

References

External links
 Fermat's factorization running time, at blogspot.in
 Fermat's Factorization Online Calculator, at windowspros.ru

Integer factorization algorithms